Hippopotamuses are an introduced species in Colombia. Four hippopotamuses were kept by Pablo Escobar in the late 1970s, and upon his death in 1993 they were allowed to wander his unattended estate. By 2019 their population had grown to approximately one hundred individuals, causing concerns they may harm the native flora and fauna in the area; as well as posing significant threat to human population in the area.

History 
They were deemed too difficult to seize and move after Escobar's death, and hence left on the untended estate.

By 2007, the animals had multiplied to 16 and had taken to roaming the area for food in the nearby Magdalena River. In early 2014, there were reported to be 40 hippopotamuses in Puerto Triunfo, Antioquia.

Population projections estimate that there could be thousands within a few decades. The Colombian hippos reach sexual maturity earlier than African hippos.

Conservation concerns 
Being non-native introductions, most conservationists considered them problematic and invasive in Colombia, as they have the potential to change the ecosystems, feeding heavily on plants and displacing native species like the West Indian manatee, Neotropical otter, spectacled caiman and turtles. The critically endangered Dahl's toad-headed turtle and Magdalena River turtle are largely restricted to the Magdalena River basin, as are many threatened fish. In 2020, a study showed that there was an increase in the nutrient levels and cyanobacteria in Colombian lakes inhabited by hippos. Cyanobacteria can cause toxic algae blooms and die-offs of aquatic fauna. Despite the limited magnitude of the observed change, it was noticeable since the species' population was still quite small.

In contrast to the opposition by most conservationists, some ecologists have argued that they should remain and might even have a positive effect on the local environment. It has been suggested that the nutrients they introduce to the water and the occasional fish kills caused by them are overall positive, but this was based on a study in their native Africa. Alternatively, the introduced hippos could be a form of Pleistocene rewilding project, replacing species like Toxodon that became extinct in prehistoric times, but Pleistocene rewilding itself is highly controversial. Others have argued that the Colombian hippos should be regarded as a safe population, isolated from the threats faced by African hippos, and that they could be beneficial to the local ecotourism industry.

Incidents 
Hippopotamuses can represent a serious threat to fishers and other locals. There have been attacks on humans, but as of 2017 nobody has been killed by the Colombian hippos.

In 2020, a hippo chased down and severely injured a farmer, which prompted research into the hippos’ population growth.

Control efforts 
In 2009, one adult hippopotamus (called "Pepe") was killed by hunters under authorization of the local authorities. When a photo of the dead hippo became public, it caused considerable controversy among animal rights groups both within the country and abroad, and further plans of culling ceased.

Alternative methods have been considered, but they are unproven, or difficult and expensive. In 2017 a wild male hippo was caught, castrated and released again, but it cost about US$50,000.

In 2020, there were no plans by the local government to manage the population, but further studies on their effect on the habitat have been initiated. Because of the fast-growing population, conservationists recommended that a management plan needed to be rapidly developed.

By October 2021, the Colombian government had started a program to sterilize the hippos using a chemical to make them infertile.

In March 2023, it was announced that the Colombian government is proposing transferring at least 70 hippopotamuses to India and Mexico as part of a plan to control their population.

Media 
In 2013, the National Geographic Channel produced a documentary about the species in Colombia titled Cocaine Hippos.

In series 3 of The Grand Tour, the presenters went to Colombia to photograph wildlife, including hippos.

See also
List of invasive species in Colombia

References

Hippos
Exotic pets
Hippopotamuses
Invasive mammal species
Feral animals